United States v. Fenwick, United States v. Fenwick, 25 F. Cas. 1062, 1964 (C.C. D.C. 1836), was a decision of the United States Circuit Court of the District of Columbia that was handed down April 7, 1836. It confirmed the right of a defendant in a criminal case not to have the judge render a decision on motions until all arguments have been made, to defer making those arguments until the jury is empaneled, and to make those legal arguments to the jury.

See also 
United States District Court for the District of Columbia
List of notable United States Courts of Appeals cases

References and  external links 

HTML of the decision from the DC Circuit

United States Native American case law
1836 in United States case law